Fateh (Arabic: فَتْح fat·ḥ) is the Turkish spelling of Arabic name and surname Fatah, meaning "open, begin, start, commence". 

Notable people with the name include:

Given name 
 Fateh Daud, Ismaili Shi'a ruler of Multan
 Fateh Naseeb Khan (1890–1933), General-in-chief of Alwar State Forces
 Ustad Nusrat Fateh Ali Khan, Pakistani musician, often regarded as one of the greatest voices recorded
 Fateh Kamel, Algerian-Canadian, terrorism supporter for plotting attacks against French targets
 Fateh Shah, king of Garhwal, a small kingdom in North India, from 1684 to 1716
 Fateh Singh, 4th & youngest son of Guru Gobind Singh, Sikh martyr
 Rahat Fateh Ali Khan, Pakistani singer

Surname 
 Abul Fateh, Bangladeshi diplomat

See also
 Fatih (name)